Thanksgiving Square is an area of public space in Lanyon Place in Belfast based on Thanks-Giving Square in Dallas, Texas. It contains the Beacon of Hope sculpture.

Concept 
The area was proposed by Myrtle Smyth, who was inspired by Thanks-Giving Square in Dallas.

Lord Diljit Rana, Baron Rana, chairman of the Thanksgiving Square charity, said the aim of the project was to create some public space for giving thanks.

See also 
 Beacon of Hope
 Andy Scott
 Thanks-Giving Square

References

External links 
 Belfast City Council

Geography of Belfast